Alexius Obabu Makozi (born 1932 in Okene) was a Nigerian clergyman and bishop for the Roman Catholic Diocese of Lokoja. He was appointed bishop in 1971; he later assumed the same role in Port Harcourt. He died in 2016.

References 

1932 births
2016 deaths
Nigerian Roman Catholic bishops
Roman Catholic bishops of Lokoja
Roman Catholic bishops of Port Harcourt